Johannes Willibrordus Maria "Jan" Hendriks is the current bishop of Roman Catholic Diocese of Haarlem-Amsterdam, appointed 1 June 2020.

Biography
Hendriks was born on November 17, 1954 in Leidschendam, in the Roman Catholic Diocese of Rotterdam. He studied philosophy and theology at the Higher Institute of Theology in Amsterdam, Netherlands and at the major seminary of the Roman Catholic Diocese of Roermond in Rolduc, Netherlands. He was ordained a priest on September 
27, 1979, for the Diocese of Rotterdam. From 1979 to 1981 he was the Deputy Rector in Den Haag, Netherlands. He then continued his studies at the Pontifical Gregorian University, obtaining his Doctorate in Canon Law (J.C.D.). During this period, he lived at the Pontifical Dutch College. From 1987 to 1997, he was pastor in Haastrecht, Netherlands. In 1997, he was appointed Vice-Rector, and in 1998, Rector, of the Seminary of the Diocese of Haarlem-Amsterdam, where he also teaches Canon Law. In 2005, he was awarded the title "Chaplain of His Holiness", the lowest grade of Monsignor. He is also the Canon of the Cathedral Chapter of Haarlem-Amsterdam and a member of the Diocesan Council of Priests. He is also a consultant to the Sacred Congregation for the Clergy in the Roman Curia.

He was appointed as Auxiliary Bishop of Diocese of Haarlem–Amsterdam and Titular Bishop of Arsacal (Algeria), and being ordained bishop on December 10, 2011.  On September 30, 2017, Pope Francis appointed him a member of the Supreme Tribunal of the Apostolic Signatura. On December 22, 2018, he was appointed as Coadjutor Bishop of the same diocese, with the right of succession. On 1 June 2020,  he succeeded as Bishop upon the retirement of Jozef Marianus Punt.

See also

References

1954 births
Living people
21st-century Roman Catholic bishops in the Netherlands
People from Leidschendam